Jon Warden (born October 1, 1946) is an American baseball player originally from Columbus, Ohio.  A left-handed pitcher, he was selected by the Detroit Tigers in the fourth round of the 1966 amateur draft.  In the 1968 season, he played 28 games and  innings for the Tigers, ending with a 4-1 record, 3 saves, 11 games finished, and an ERA of 3.62.  After the conclusion of the 1968 season, he was selected in the expansion draft by the Kansas City Royals, but did not play any games for that team.

References

External links
 SABR Biography by Dan Holmes
 "'68 World Champion Jon Warden grateful for his only season in big leagues" from Detroit Athletic Co. 
 "Cooperstown Confidential: Jon Warden, clown prince of baseball" by Bruce Markusen 
 Jon Warden speaks at the 45th anniversary celebration of the 1968 championship at Comerica Park in Detroit
 Interview with Jon Warden from the Tigers History Podcast

1946 births
Living people
Major League Baseball pitchers
Detroit Tigers players
Daytona Beach Islanders players
Omaha Royals players
Elmira Royals players
Rocky Mount Leafs players
Evansville Triplets players
San Jose Bees players
Arkansas Travelers players
High Point-Thomasville Royals players
Baseball players from Columbus, Ohio